is a district located in Ōita Prefecture, Japan.

As of 2003, the district has an estimated population of 35,462 and the density of 163.46 persons per km2. The total area is 216.94 km2.

Towns and villages
Hiji

Merger
On October 1, 2005 the town of Yamaga, along with the village of Ōta, from Nishikunisaki District, was merged into the expanded city of Kitsuki.

Districts in Ōita Prefecture